Fundella is a genus of snout moths described by Philipp Christoph Zeller in 1848.

Species
 Fundella agapella Schaus, 1923
 Fundella ahemora Dyar, 1914
 Fundella argentina Dyar, 1919
 Fundella ignobilis Heinrich, 1945
 Fundella pellucens Zeller, 1848

References

Phycitinae